The 1898 Colorado gubernatorial election was held on November 8, 1898. Democratic nominee Charles S. Thomas defeated Republican nominee Henry R. Wolcott with 62.89% of the vote.

General election

Candidates
Major party candidates
Charles S. Thomas, Democratic
Henry R. Wolcott, Republican

Other candidates
Robert H. Rhodes, Prohibition
Nixon Elliott, Socialist Labor

Results

References

1898
Colorado
Gubernatorial